Srpska Liga may refer to:

 Serbian League, a third-division Serbian football league
 Srpska Liga, a second-division basketball league in the Republika Srpska, Bosnia and Herzegovina